The Three Stooges were an American vaudeville and comedy team active from 1922 until 1970, best remembered for their 190 short subject films by Columbia Pictures. Their hallmark styles were physical farce and slapstick. Six Stooges appeared over the act's run (with only three active at any given time): Moe Howard (born Moses Horwitz) and Larry Fine (born Louis Feinberg) were mainstays throughout the ensemble's nearly 50-year run; the pivotal "third stooge" was played by (in order of appearance) Shemp Howard (born Samuel Horwitz), Curly Howard (born Jerome Horwitz), Shemp Howard again, Joe Besser, and "Curly Joe" DeRita.

The act began in the early 1920s as part of a vaudeville comedy act billed as "Ted Healy and His Stooges", consisting originally of Ted Healy and Moe Howard. Over time, they were joined by Moe's brother, Shemp Howard, and then Larry Fine. The four appeared in one feature film, Soup to Nuts, before Shemp left to pursue a solo career. He was replaced by his and Moe's younger brother, Jerome "Curly" Howard, in 1932. Two years later, after appearing in several movies, the trio left Healy and signed on to appear in their own short-subject comedies for Columbia Pictures, now billed as "The Three Stooges". From 1934 to 1946, Moe, Larry and Curly produced over 90 short films for Columbia, bringing them their peak popularity.

Curly suffered a debilitating stroke in May 1946. Shemp returned, reconstituting the original lineup, until his death of a heart attack on November 22, 1955, three years and ten months after Curly's death of a cerebral hemorrhage on January 18, 1952. Film actor Joe Palma stood in (shot from behind to obscure his face) to complete four Shemp-era shorts under contract. This procedure—disguising one actor as another, outside of stunt shots—became known as the "fake Shemp". Columbia contract player Joe Besser joined as the third Stooge for two years (1956–1957), departing in 1958 to nurse his ill wife after Columbia terminated its shorts division. The studio then released all the shorts via Screen Gems, Columbia's television studio and distribution unit. Screen Gems then syndicated the shorts to television, whereupon the Stooges became one of the most popular comedy acts of the early 1960s.

Comic actor Joe DeRita became "Curly Joe" in 1958, replacing Besser for a new series of full-length theatrical films. With intense television exposure in the United States, the act regained momentum throughout the 1960s as popular kids' fare, until Larry's paralyzing stroke in the midst of filming a pilot for a Three Stooges TV series in January 1970. He died in January 1975, after a further series of strokes. Unsuccessful attempts were made in 1970 and 1975 to revive the act with longtime supporting actor Emil Sitka in Fine's role, but they were cut short by Moe Howard's death on May 4, 1975.

History

Ted Healy and His Stooges (1922–1934) 
The Three Stooges began in 1922 as part of a raucous vaudeville act called "Ted Healy and His Stooges" ("stooges" being show-business slang for on-stage assistants). The act was also known as "Ted Healy and His Southern Gentlemen" and "Ted Healy and His Racketeers". Moe Howard (born Moses Harry Horwitz) joined Healy's act in 1922, and his brother Shemp Howard (Samuel Horwitz) came aboard a few months later. After several shifts and changes in the Stooges membership, violinist-comedian Larry Fine (Louis Feinberg) also joined the group sometime between 1925 and 1928. In the act, lead comedian Healy would attempt to sing or tell jokes while his noisy assistants would keep interrupting him, causing Healy to retaliate with verbal and physical abuse.

In 1930, Ted Healy and His Stooges (plus comedian Fred Sanborn) appeared in Soup to Nuts, their first Hollywood feature film, released by Fox Film Corporation. The film was not a critical success, but the Stooges' performances were singled out as memorable, leading Fox to offer the trio a contract, minus Healy. This enraged Healy, who told studio executives the Stooges were his employees, whereupon the offer was withdrawn. Howard, Fine, and Howard learned of the offer and subsequent withdrawal, and left Healy to form their own act (billed as "Howard, Fine & Howard" or "Three Lost Souls"). The act quickly took off with a tour of the theater circuit. Healy attempted to stop the new act with legal action, claiming that they were using his copyrighted material. There are accounts of Healy threatening to bomb theaters if Howard, Fine and Howard ever performed there, which worried Shemp so much that he almost left the act; reportedly, only a pay raise kept him on board.

Healy tried to save his act by hiring replacement stooges, but they were inexperienced and not as well-received as their predecessors. Healy reached a new agreement with his former Stooges in 1932, with Moe now acting as business manager, and they were booked in a production of Jacob J. Shubert's The Passing Show of 1932. During rehearsals, Healy received a more lucrative offer and found a loophole in his contract allowing him to leave the production. Shemp, fed up with Healy's abrasiveness, bad temper, and heavy drinking, decided to quit the act and toured in his own comedy revue for several months.

Shemp had been working for the Vitaphone studio in Brooklyn, New York since 1931. He first appeared in movie comedies playing small roles and bits in the Roscoe Arbuckle shorts, and gradually worked his way up to star comedian. Shemp stayed with Vitaphone through 1937.

With Shemp gone, Healy and the two remaining stooges (Moe and Larry) needed a replacement, so Moe suggested his younger brother Jerry Howard. Healy reportedly took one look at Jerry, who had long chestnut-red hair and a handlebar mustache, and remarked that Jerry didn't look like he was funny. Jerry left the room and returned a few minutes later with his head shaved (although his mustache remained for a time), saying: "Boy, do I look girly." Healy heard "Curly", and the name stuck. Other accounts have been given for how the Curly character actually came about.

Metro-Goldwyn-Mayer (MGM) signed Healy and his Stooges to a movie contract in 1933. They appeared in feature films and short subjects together, individually, or with various combinations of actors. The trio was featured in a series of musical comedy shorts, beginning with Nertsery Rhymes. It was one of a few shorts to be made with an early two-color Technicolor process. These also included one featuring Curly without Healy or the other Stooges, Roast Beef and Movies (1934), as well as the recently rediscovered Technicolor short Hello Pop!. Jail Birds of Paradise (1934) was also shot in Technicolor, but as of 2022 no print has been found. The short films were built around recycled Technicolor film footage of production numbers cut from MGM musicals, such as Children of Pleasure, Lord Byron of Broadway and the unfinished March of Time (all 1930). The studio concluded the series with standard, black-and-white two-reel subjects: Beer and Pretzels (1933) Plane Nuts (1933), and The Big Idea (1934).

Healy and company also appeared in several MGM feature films as comic relief, including:

 Turn Back the Clock (1933)
 Meet the Baron (1933)
 Dancing Lady (1933) (with Joan Crawford, Clark Gable, Fred Astaire and Robert Benchley)
 Fugitive Lovers (1934)
 Hollywood Party (1934). 

Healy and the Stooges also appeared together in Myrt and Marge for Universal Pictures.

In 1934, the team's contract expired with MGM, and the Stooges' professional association with Healy came to an end. According to Moe Howard's autobiography, the split was precipitated by Healy's alcoholism and abrasiveness. Their final film with Healy was MGM's Hollywood Party (1934). Both Healy and the Stooges went on to separate successes, with Healy dying under mysterious circumstances in 1937.

Columbia years (1934–1958)

Moe, Larry, and Curly (1934–1946) 

In 1934, the trio—now officially named "The Three Stooges"—contracted to Columbia Pictures for a series of two-reel comedy short subjects. Moe wrote in his autobiography that they each received $600 per week (equal to $ today) on a one-year contract with a renewable option; in the Ted Okuda–Edward Watz book The Columbia Comedy Shorts, the Stooges are said to have received $1,000 among them for their first Columbia effort, Woman Haters (1934), and then signed a term contract for $7,500 per film (equal to $ today), to be divided among the trio.

Within their first year at Columbia, theater bookings for the Stooges films took off. Columbia Pictures president Harry Cohn was able to use the Stooges as leverage, as the demand for their films was so great that he eventually refused to supply exhibitors with the trio's shorts unless they also agreed to book some of the studio's mediocre B movies. Cohn also saw to it that the Stooges remained unaware of their popularity. During their 23 years at Columbia, the Stooges were never completely aware of their amazing drawing power. Their contracts with the studio included an open option that had to be renewed yearly, and Cohn would tell them that the short subjects were in decline, which was not a complete fabrication (Cohn's yearly mantra was "the market for comedy shorts is dying out, fellas").

The Stooges thought that their days were numbered and would sweat it out each year, with Cohn renewing their contract at the last moment. This deception kept the insecure Stooges unaware of their true value, resulting in them having second thoughts about asking for a better contract without a yearly option. Cohn's scare tactics worked for all 23 years that the Stooges were at Columbia; the team never once asked for a salary increase—nor were they ever given one. 

It was not until after they stopped making the shorts in December 1957 that Moe learned of Cohn's tactics, what a valuable commodity the Stooges had been for the studio, and how many millions more the act could have earned. Columbia offered theater owners an entire program of two-reel comedies (15–25 titles annually) featuring such stars as Buster Keaton, Andy Clyde, Charley Chase and Hugh Herbert, but the Stooge shorts were the most popular of all.

The Stooges' release schedule was eight short subjects per year, filmed within a 40-week period; for the remaining 12 weeks, they were free to pursue other employment, time that was either spent with their families or touring the country with their live act. The Stooges appeared in 190 film shorts and five features while at Columbia, outlasting every one of their contemporaries employed in the short-film genre. Del Lord directed more than three dozen Stooge films, Jules White directed dozens more and his brother Jack White directed several under the pseudonym "Preston Black". Silent-comedy star Charley Chase also shared directorial responsibilities with Lord and White.

The Stooge films made between 1935 and 1941 captured the team at their peak, according to film historians Ted Okuda and Edward Watz, authors of The Columbia Comedy Shorts. Nearly every film produced became a classic in its own right. Hoi Polloi (1935) adapted the premise of Pygmalion, with a stuffy professor making a bet that he can transform the uncultured trio into refined gentlemen; the plotline worked so well that it was reused twice, as Half-Wits Holiday (1947) and Pies and Guys (1958). Three Little Beers (1935) featured the Stooges running amok on a golf course to win prize money. Disorder in the Court (1936) features the team as star witnesses in a murder trial. Violent is the Word for Curly (1938) was a quality Chase-directed short that featured the musical interlude "Swingin' the Alphabet".

In A Plumbing We Will Go (1940)—one of the team's quintessential comedies—the Stooges are cast as plumbers who nearly destroy a socialite's mansion, causing water to exit every appliance in the home, including an early television set. This was remade twice, as Vagabond Loafers and Scheming Schemers. Other entries of the era are considered among the team's finest work, including Uncivil Warriors (1935), A Pain in the Pullman and False Alarms (both 1936), Grips, Grunts and Groans, The Sitter Downers, Dizzy Doctors (all 1937), Tassels in the Air (1938), We Want Our Mummy (1939), Nutty but Nice (1940), and An Ache in Every Stake and In the Sweet Pie and Pie (both 1941).

With the onset of World War II, the Stooges released several entries that poked fun at the rising Axis powers. You Nazty Spy! (1940) and its sequel I'll Never Heil Again (1941) lampooned Hitler and the Nazis at a time when America was still neutral. Moe was cast as "Moe Hailstone", an Adolf Hitler-like character, with Curly playing a Hermann Göring character (replete with medals) and Larry as Joachim von Ribbentrop-type ambassador. Moe, Larry, and director Jules White considered You Nazty Spy! their best film. Yet, these efforts indulged in a deliberately formless, non-sequitur style of verbal humor that was not the Stooges' forte, according to Okuda and Watz.

Other wartime entries have their moments, such as They Stooge to Conga (considered the most violent Stooge short), Higher Than a Kite, Back From the Front (all 1943), Gents Without Cents (1944) and the anti-Japanese The Yoke's on Me (also 1944). However, taken in bulk, the wartime films are considered less funny than what preceded them. No Dough Boys (1944) is often considered the best of these farces. The team, made up as Japanese soldiers for a photo shoot, is mistaken for genuine saboteurs by a Nazi ringleader (Vernon Dent, the Stooges' primary foil). The highlight of the film features the Stooges engaging in nonsensical gymnastics (the real spies are renowned acrobats) for a skeptical group of enemy agents.

Wartime also brought on rising production costs that resulted in fewer elaborate gags and outdoor sequences, Del Lord's stock in trade; as such, the quality of the team's films (particularly those directed by Lord) began to slip after 1942. According to Okuda and Watz, entries such as Loco Boy Makes Good, What's the Matador?, Sock-A-Bye Baby (all 1942), I Can Hardly Wait and A Gem of a Jam (both 1943) are considered to be lesser quality works than previous films. Spook Louder (1943), a remake of Mack Sennett's The Great Pie Mystery (1931), is sometimes cited as the Stooges' worst film because of its repetitious and rehashed jokes. Three Smart Saps (1942), a film considered to be an improvement, features a reworking of a routine from Harold Lloyd's The Freshman (1925), in which Curly's loosely basted suit begins to come apart at the seams while he is on the dance floor.

The Stooges made occasional supporting appearances in feature films, though generally they were restricted to their short subjects. Most of the Stooges' peers had either made the transition from shorts to feature films (Laurel and Hardy, The Ritz Brothers) or starred in their own feature films from the onset (Marx Brothers, Abbott and Costello). However, Moe believed that the team's slapstick style worked better in short form. In 1935, Columbia proposed to star them in their own full-length feature, but Moe rejected the idea saying, "It's a hard job inventing, rewriting, or stealing gags for our two-reel comedies for Columbia Pictures without having to make a seven-reeler (feature film). We can make short films out of material needed for a starring feature, and then we wouldn't know whether it would be funny enough to click."

Film critics have cited Curly as the most popular member of the team. His childlike mannerisms and natural comedic charm (he had no previous acting experience) made him a hit with audiences, particularly children and women (the latter usually finding the trio's humor juvenile and uncouth). Because Curly had to shave his head for the act, it led him to feel unappealing to women. To mask his insecurities, he ate and drank to excess and caroused whenever the Stooges made personal appearances, which was approximately seven months of each year. His weight ballooned in the 1940s, and his blood pressure became dangerously high. Curly's wild lifestyle and constant drinking eventually caught up with him in 1945, and his performances suffered.

During a five-month hiatus from August 1945 through January 1946, the trio committed themselves to making a feature film at Monogram, followed by a two-month-long live appearance gig in New York City, with performances seven days a week. Curly also entered a disastrous third marriage in October 1945, leading to a separation in January 1946 and divorce in July 1946. That unhappy union wrecked his already fragile health. Upon the Stooges' return to Los Angeles in late November 1945, Curly was a shell of his former self. They had two months to rest before reporting back to Columbia in late January 1946, but Curly's condition was irreversible. They had only 24 days of work over the next three months, but eight weeks of time off could not help the situation. In those last six shorts, ranging from Monkey Businessmen (1946) through Half-Wits Holiday (1947), Curly was seriously ill, struggling to get through even the most basic scenes.

During the final day of filming Half-Wits Holiday (1947) on May 6, 1946, Curly suffered a debilitating stroke on the set, ending his 14-year career. They hoped for a full recovery, but Curly never appeared in a film again except for a single cameo appearance in the third film after Shemp returned to the trio, Hold That Lion! (1947). It was the only film that contained all four of the original Stooges (the three Howard brothers and Larry) on screen simultaneously. According to Jules White, this anomaly came about when Curly visited the set one day, and White had him do this bit for fun. Curly's cameo appearance was recycled in the remake Booty and the Beast, 1953.

In 1949, Curly filmed a brief scene for Malice in the Palace (1949) as the restaurant's cook, but it was not used. Jules White's copy of the script contained the dialogue for this missing scene, and a production still of Curly does exist, appearing on both the film's original one-sheet and lobby card. Larry played the role of the cook in the final print.

Shemp's return (1946–1955) 

Moe asked his older brother Shemp to take Curly's place, but Shemp was hesitant to rejoin the Stooges as he was enjoying a successful solo career. He realized, however, that not rejoining the Stooges would mean the end of Moe's and Larry's film careers. Shemp wanted assurance that rejoining them would be only temporary and that he could leave the Stooges once Curly recovered. However, Curly's health continued to deteriorate, and it became clear that he could not return. As a result, Shemp resumed being a Stooge full-time for nearly a decade. Curly remained ill until his death of a cerebral hemorrhage from additional strokes on January 18, 1952.

Shemp appeared with the Stooges in 76 shorts and a low-budget Western comedy feature titled Gold Raiders (1951) in which the screen time was evenly divided with cowboy hero George O'Brien. Shemp's return improved the quality of the films, as the previous few had been marred by Curly's sluggish performances. Entries such as Out West (1947), Squareheads of the Round Table (1948) and Punchy Cowpunchers (1950) proved that Shemp could hold his own. New director Edward Bernds, who joined the team in 1945 when Curly was failing, sensed that routines and plotlines that worked well with Curly as the comic focus did not fit Shemp's persona, and allowed the comedian to develop his own Stooge character. Jules White, however, persisted in employing the "living cartoon" style of comedy that reigned during the Curly era. White would force either Shemp or Moe to perform similar gags and mannerisms originated by Curly, resulting in what appeared to be lackluster imitations. Most acutely, it created the "Curly vs. Shemp" debate that overshadowed the act upon Curly's departure. The Stooges lost some of their charm and inherent appeal to children after Curly retired, but some excellent films were produced with Shemp, an accomplished solo comedian who often performed best when allowed to improvise on his own.

The films from the Shemp era contrast sharply with those from the Curly era, largely owing to the individual directing styles of Bernds and White. From 1947 to 1952, Bernds hit a string of successes, including Fright Night (1947), The Hot Scots, Mummy's Dummies, Crime on Their Hands (all 1948), A Snitch in Time (1950), Three Arabian Nuts (1951) and Gents in a Jam (1952). Two of the team's finest efforts were directed by Bernds: Brideless Groom (1947) and Who Done It? (1949). White also contributed a few fair entries, such as Hold That Lion! (1947), Hokus Pokus (1949), Scrambled Brains (1951), A Missed Fortune and Corny Casanovas (both 1952).

Another benefit from the Shemp era was that Larry was given more time on screen. Throughout most of the Curly era, Larry was relegated to a background role, but by the time that Shemp rejoined the Stooges, Larry was allotted equal footage, even becoming the focus of several films, in particular Fuelin' Around (1949) and He Cooked His Goose (1952).

The Shemp years also marked a major milestone: the Stooges' first appearance on television. In 1948, they guest-starred on Milton Berle's popular Texaco Star Theater and Morey Amsterdam's The Morey Amsterdam Show. By 1949, the team filmed a pilot for ABC-TV for their own weekly television series, titled Jerks of All Trades. Columbia Pictures blocked the series from going into production, but allowed the Stooges to make television guest appearances. The team went on to appear on Camel Comedy Caravan (also known as The Ed Wynn Show), The Kate Smith Hour, The Colgate Comedy Hour, The Frank Sinatra Show and The Eddie Cantor Comedy Theatre, among others.

In 1952, the Stooges lost some key players at Columbia Pictures. The studio decided to downsize its short-subject division, resulting in producer Hugh McCollum being discharged and director Edward Bernds resigning out of loyalty to McCollum. Screenwriter Elwood Ullman, who had worked closely with Bernds, also resigned. Bernds had been contemplating his resignation for some time, as he and Jules White were often at odds. Bernds's departure left only White to direct the Stooges' remaining Columbia comedies. Not long after, the quality of the team's output markedly declined, with producer-director White now assuming complete control over production. DVD Talk critic Stuart Galbraith IV commented that "the Stooges' shorts became increasingly mechanical...and frequently substituted violent sight gags for story and characterization." Production was also significantly faster, with the former four-day filming schedules now tightened to two or three days. In another cost-cutting measure, White would create a "new" Stooge short by borrowing footage from old ones, setting it in a slightly different storyline and filming a few new scenes, often with the same actors in the same costumes. White was initially very subtle when recycling older footage: he would reuse only a single sequence of old film, re-edited so cleverly that it was not easy to detect. The later shorts were cheaper and the recycling more obvious, with as much as 75% of the running time consisting of old footage. White came to rely so much on older material that he could film the "new" shorts in a single day. New footage filmed in order to link older material suffered from White's heavy-handed directing style and penchant for telling his actors how to act. Shemp, in particular, disliked working with White after 1952.

Three years after Curly's death, Shemp Howard died of a heart attack at age 60 on November 22, 1955, during a taxi ride home with a friend after attending a boxing match. Moe was stunned and contemplated disbanding the Stooges. However, Columbia had promised exhibitors eight Stooge shorts for the year but only four had been completed, forcing producer Jules White to manufacture four more shorts "with Shemp." Recycled footage of Shemp, combined with new footage of Columbia supporting player Joe Palma doubling for him (see also Fake Shemp), was used to complete the last four films: Rumpus in the Harem, Hot Stuff, Scheming Schemers and Commotion on the Ocean (all released in 1956).

Joe Besser replaces Shemp (1956–1958) 

By 1956 Moe Howard and Larry Fine were carrying the short-subject series as a two-man team, apart from third member Shemp, who was seen entirely in older footage. Moe proposed that he and Larry could continue working as a duo, "The Two Stooges." Columbia flatly refused, having promoted the team as "The Three Stooges" for decades. Moe was forced to recruit a third Stooge. Several comedians were considered, including nightclub comic Buddy Hackett, burlesque comic (and former Ted Healy stooge) Paul "Mousie" Garner, and noted African-American comedian Mantan Moreland, but Columbia insisted on a comedian already under contract to the studio. They agreed on Joe Besser, who appeared in the final 16 Stooge shorts at Columbia. Besser had been starring in his own short-subject comedies for the studio since 1949 and appeared in supporting roles in a variety of movies, making his persona sufficiently well known.

Besser had observed how one side of Larry Fine's face appeared "calloused", so he had a clause in his contract specifically prohibiting him from being hit beyond an infrequent tap, though this restriction was later lifted. "I usually played the kind of character who would hit others back," Besser recalled.

Despite Besser's prolific film and stage career, Stooge entries featuring him have often been considered the team's weakest. During his tenure, the films were assailed as questionable models for youth, and in response began to resemble television sitcoms. Sitcoms, however, were available for free on television, making the short film a throwback to a bygone era. Besser was a talented comic, and was quite popular as "Stinky" on The Abbott and Costello Show. However, his whining mannerisms and the lack of slapstick punishment against him did not quite blend with the Stooges' brand of humor. His presence, though, did create verbal friction between Moe and Larry that improved their mutually insulting banter. 

Times had changed, and Besser was not solely to blame for the quality of these final entries; the scripts were rehashes of earlier efforts, the budgets were lower, and Moe's and Larry's advanced ages prohibited them from performing as much of the physical comedy that was their trademark. Besser had suggested that Moe and Larry comb their hair back to give them a more gentlemanly appearance. Both Moe and Jules White approved of the idea, but used it sparingly. Their other films—remakes of older comedies—required the familiar Stooge haircuts to match the older footage.

Despite their lukewarm reception, the Besser shorts did have their moments. In general, the remakes had the traditional Stooges knockabout, such as 1958's Pies and Guys (a scene-for-scene remake of Half-Wits Holiday, which itself was a reworking of the earlier Hoi Polloi), Guns a Poppin (1957), Rusty Romeos (1957), and Triple Crossed (1959). In contrast, Hoofs and Goofs, Horsing Around, and Muscle Up a Little Closer (all 1957) mostly resembled the sitcoms of the era. A Merry Mix Up (also 1957) and Oil's Well That Ends Well (1958) are also amusing, while the musical Sweet and Hot (1958) deserves some credit for straying from the norm. The American science-fiction craze also led to three entries focusing on space travel: Space Ship Sappy, Outer Space Jitters (both 1957), and Flying Saucer Daffy (1958).

Columbia was the last studio still producing live-action two-reel comedies (the Stooges' last live-action competition, the one-reel Joe McDoakes series, had ended its run in 1956), and the market for such films had all but ceased. As a result, Jules White told Columbia president Harry Cohn that he was shutting down the two-reel-comedy department at the end of 1957. The final comedy produced was Flying Saucer Daffy, filmed on December 19–20, 1957. Several days later, the Stooges were unceremoniously fired from Columbia Pictures after 24 years of employment.

No formal goodbyes or congratulatory celebrations occurred in recognition of their work and of the money that their comedies had earned for the studio. Moe visited Columbia several weeks after the dismissal to say goodbye to several executives. But without the current year's studio pass, Moe was refused entry, later stating that it was a crushing blow to his pride.

The studio had enough completed Stooge films to be released over the next 18 months, though not in the order in which they were produced. The final Stooge release, Sappy Bull Fighters, did not reach theaters until June 4, 1959. With no active contract in place, Moe and Larry discussed plans for a personal appearance tour. In the meantime, Besser's wife suffered a minor heart attack and he preferred to stay local, leading him to withdraw from the act.

Comeback with Joe DeRita (1958–1970) 

After Besser's departure, Moe and Larry began looking for potential replacements. Larry suggested former Ted Healy stooge Paul "Mousie" Garner, but based on his tryout performance, Moe later remarked that he was "completely unacceptable." Weeks later, Larry came across burlesque performer Joe DeRita, who had starred in his own series of shorts at Columbia back in the 1940s, and thought he would be a good fit.

The early days of television provided movie studios a place to unload a backlog of short films that they thought otherwise unmarketable, and the Stooge films seemed perfect for the burgeoning genre. ABC had even expressed interest as far back as 1949, purchasing exclusive rights to 30 of the trio's shorts and commissioning a pilot for a potential series, Jerks of All Trades. However, the success of television revivals for such names as Laurel and Hardy, Woody Woodpecker, Popeye, Tom and Jerry and the Our Gang series in the late 1950s led Columbia to cash in again on the Stooges. In September 1958, Columbia's television subsidiary Screen Gems offered a package consisting of 78 Stooge shorts (primarily from the Curly era), which were well received. 

An additional 40 shorts hit the market in April 1959. By September 1959, all 190 Stooge shorts were airing regularly. With so many films available for broadcast, daily television airings provided heavy exposure aimed squarely at children. Parents who had grown up seeing the same films in the theaters began to watch alongside their children and, before long, Howard, Fine, and DeRita were in great demand. After it was discovered that the Curly-era shorts were the most popular, Moe suggested that DeRita shave his head to accentuate his slight resemblance to Curly Howard. He adopted first a crew cut and later a completely shaven head, thus becoming "Curly Joe."

This lineup, now frequently referred to as "Larry, Moe, and Curly Joe," starred in six full-length feature films from 1959 to 1965: Have Rocket, Will Travel (1959), Snow White and the Three Stooges (1961), The Three Stooges Meet Hercules (1962), The Three Stooges in Orbit (1962), The Three Stooges Go Around the World in a Daze (1963) and The Outlaws IS Coming! (1965). The films were aimed at the kiddie-matinee market, and most were black-and-white farce outings in the Stooge tradition, with the exception of Snow White and the Three Stooges, a children's fantasy in color.

They had an extremely brief cameo in the film It's a Mad, Mad, Mad, Mad World (1963), appearing as firemen. Larry, Moe, and Shemp had played firemen in their first film, Rube Goldberg's Soup to Nuts (1930), during their lengthy stint in "Ted Healy and His Stooges". They appeared in a larger capacity in 1963 in 4 for Texas starring Frank Sinatra and Dean Martin. Throughout the early 1960s, the Stooges were one of the most popular and highest-paid live acts in America. They played theaters, summer festivals, fairgrounds, and other venues, and twice performed as the featured act at the Canadian National Exposition. In 1968, they toured Hawaii where they starred in the International 3-Ring Circus at the Honolulu International Center.

The Stooges also tried their hand at another weekly television series in 1960 titled The Three Stooges Scrapbook, filmed in color and with a laugh track. The first episode, "Home Cooking", featured the boys rehearsing for a new television show. Like Jerks of All Trades in 1949, the pilot did not sell. However, Norman Maurer was able to reuse the footage (reprocessed in black and white) for the first ten minutes of The Three Stooges in Orbit.

The trio also filmed 41 short comedy skits for The New Three Stooges in 1965, which features a series of 156 animated cartoons produced for television. The Stooges appeared in live-action color footage, which preceded and followed each animated adventure in which they voiced their respective characters.

During this period, The Stooges appeared on numerous television shows including The Steve Allen Show, Here's Hollywood, Masquerade Party, The Ed Sullivan Show, Danny Thomas Meets the Comics, The Joey Bishop Show, Off to See the Wizard and Truth or Consequences.

Final years (1970–1975) 
In late 1969, Howard, Fine and DeRita began production on another half-hour pilot, this time for a syndicated 39-episode TV series titled Kook's Tour, a combination travelogue-sitcom that had the "retired" Stooges traveling to various parts of the world with the episodes filmed on location. On January 9, 1970, during production of the pilot, Larry suffered a paralyzing stroke, ending his acting career along with plans for the television series. The pilot was unfinished and several key shots were missing, but producer Norman Maurer edited the available footage and made the pilot a 52-minute special that was released to the home-movie and Cartrivision videocassette home video markets in 1973. It is the last film in which the Stooges appeared and the last known performance of the team.

Following Larry Fine's stroke, plans were made for Emil Sitka to replace him in a new feature film, written by Moe Howard's grandson, Jeffrey Scott [Maurer], titled Make Love, Not War. Moe Howard, Joe DeRita, and Emil Sitka were cast as POWs in a World War II Japanese prison camp, plotting an escape with fellow prisoners. The film would have been a departure from typical Stooge fare, with dark-edged humor and scenes of war violence, but insufficient funding prevented production from advancing beyond the script stage.

Also in 1970, Joe DeRita recruited vaudeville veterans Frank Mitchell and Mousie Garner to tour as The New Three Stooges. Garner had worked with Ted Healy as one of his "replacement stooges" decades earlier and was briefly considered as Joe Besser's replacement in 1958. Mitchell had also replaced Shemp as the "third stooge" in a 1929 Broadway play, A Night in Venice,  and appeared in two of the Stooges' short subjects in 1953. The act fared poorly, with minimal bookings. By this time, Moe's wife had prevailed on him to retire from performing slapstick due to his age. For the next several years, Moe appeared regularly on talk shows and did speaking engagements at colleges, while DeRita quietly retired.

Larry suffered another stroke in mid-December 1974, and four weeks later an even more massive one. After slipping into a coma, he died a week later from a cerebral hemorrhage on January 24, 1975.

Before Larry's death, the Stooges were scheduled to co-star in the R-rated comedy Blazing Stewardesses, featuring Moe and Curly Joe with Emil Sitka in the middle spot as Harry, Larry's brother. The team was signed and publicity shots were taken, but one week prior to March's filming date, Moe was diagnosed with lung cancer and the Stooges had to back out; he died on May 4, 1975. Producer Sam Sherman briefly considered having former Stooge Joe Besser appear in his place, but ultimately decided against it. The Ritz Brothers, Harry and Jimmy, replaced the Stooges and performed much of their own schtick, including the precision dance routine first seen in Sing, Baby, Sing (1936), co-starring original Stooge leader Ted Healy.

As for the remaining original replacement stooges, Joe Besser died of heart failure on March 1, 1988, followed by Joe DeRita of pneumonia on July 3, 1993. Emil Sitka was announced as a Stooge but never performed as such; he died on January 16, 1998, six months after being disabled by a stroke.

Legacy and perspective 
Over 60 years since their last short film was released, the Three Stooges remain popular. Their films have never left American television since first appearing in 1958. They were a hard-working group of comedians who were never critics' favorites; a durable act that endured several personnel changes in careers that would have permanently sidelined a less persistent act.  They would not have lasted as long as they did as a unit without Moe Howard's guiding hand.

Ted Okuda's and Edward Watz's book The Columbia Comedy Shorts puts the Stooges' legacy in critical perspective:

Beginning in the 1980s, the Stooges finally began to receive critical recognition. The release of nearly all their films on DVD by 2010 allowed critics of Joe Besser and Joe DeRita—often the recipients of significant fan backlash—to appreciate both men's unique styles of comedy. The DVD market has also allowed fans to view the entire Stooge film corpus as distinct periods in their long career, rather than unfairly comparing one Stooge to another (the Curly vs. Shemp debate continues to this day, with Joe Besser not even mentioned in the same breath).

The team appeared in 220 films, but it is the durability of the 190 short films they made at Columbia Pictures that is their enduring legacy. In 1984, American television personality Steve Allen said, "Although they never achieved widespread critical acclaim, they did succeed in accomplishing what they had always intended to do: They made people laugh."

Social commentary, satire, and use of language

Although the Three Stooges' slapstick comedy was primarily arranged around basic plots dealing with mundane issues of daily life, a number of their shorts featured social commentary or satire. They were often anti-heroical commentators on class divisions and economic hardships of the Great Depression in the United States. They were usually under- or unemployed and sometimes homeless or living in shanty towns.

The language used by the Three Stooges was more slang-laden than that of typical feature films of the period and deliberately affected a lower class status with use of crude terms, ethnic mannerisms and inside jokes.

An example is the use of the initials A.K. for big shots and pretentious people. A.K. was an inside joke which stood for Alte Kocker (Lit: elderly person who is defecating), a Yiddish idiom which means an old man or woman of diminished capacity who can no longer do things they used to do.

Much of the seeming "gibberish" that the Stooges sometimes spoke was actually the Yiddish language of their Jewish ancestry. The most famous example occurs 15 minutes into the 1938 short Mutts to You. Moe and Larry were impersonating Chinese laundrymen in an attempt to fool the local cop. While being questioned Larry says "Ech Bin A China Boychic Frim Slobatkya-Gebernya Hak Mir Nisht Ken Tshaynik And I Dont Mean Efsher". This translates as "I'm a China boy from Slobatkya Gebernya [a made-up area in eastern Russia] so stop annoying me and I don't mean maybe."

A third “in-Yiddish” joke is in the episode Pardon My Scotch when the liquor supplier prepares to consume the Stooges' volatile concoction, and they wish him well in a triad pattern saying "Over the river," "Skip the gutter," and concluding with "Ver geharget," a Yiddish expression meaning "get killed" or "drop dead."

One important area of political commentary was in the area of the rise of totalitarianism in Europe, notably in the directly satirical You Nazty Spy! and I'll Never Heil Again, both released before United States' entry into World War II despite an industry Production Code that advocated avoiding social and political issues and the negative portrayal of foreign countries.

In their classic 1940 short “No Census, No Feelings”, the Stooges refer to Will H. Hays and his position as Hollywood's censor, when Moe tells Curly, “We have a job now, we’re working for the census”, and Curly replies, “You mean Will Hays?”

Lineups on film

Filmography 

The Three Stooges appeared in 220 films through their career. Of those 220, 190 short films were made for Columbia Pictures, for which the trio are best known today. Their first Columbia film, Woman Haters, premiered on May 5, 1934. Their contract was extended each year until the final one expired on December 31, 1957. The last 8 of the 16 shorts with Joe Besser were released over the next 18 months. The final release, Sappy Bull Fighters, premiered on June 4, 1959.

C3 Entertainment, Inc. 

In 1959, Comedy III Productions (later, C3 Entertainment) was formed by Moe, Larry and Joe DeRita to manage all business and merchandise transactions. Now controlled by DeRita's heirs, it has diversified into a brand-management company licensing personality rights to various nostalgia acts, including the Stooges.

Television 

A handful of Three Stooges shorts first aired on television in 1949, on the American Broadcasting Company (ABC) network. It was not until 1958 that Screen Gems packaged 78 shorts for national syndication; the package was gradually enlarged to encompass the entire library of 190 shorts. In 1959, KTTV in Los Angeles purchased the Three Stooges films for air, but by the early 1970s, rival station KTLA began airing the Stooges films, keeping them in the schedule until early 1994. The Family Channel ran the shorts as part of their Stooge TV block from February 19, 1996, to January 2, 1998. In the late 1990s, AMC had held the rights to the Three Stooges shorts, originally airing them under a programming block called "Stooges Playhouse". In 1999, it was replaced with a program called N.Y.U.K. (New Yuk University of Knuckleheads), which starred actor/comedian Leslie Nielsen. The program would show three random Stooge shorts. Nielsen hosts the program as a college instructor, known as the Professor of Stoogelogy, who teaches to the students lectures on the Three Stooges before the Stooges' shorts air. The block aired several shorts often grouped by a theme, such as similar schtick used in different films. Although the block was discontinued after AMC revamped their format in 2002, the network still ran Stooges shorts occasionally. The AMC run ended when Spike TV (now Paramount Network) picked them up in 2004, airing them in their Stooges Slap-Happy Hour every Saturday and Sunday mornings. On June 6, 2005, the network began running the Stooges Slap-Happy as a one-hour summer comedy block which ended on September 2, 2005. By 2007, the network had discontinued the block. Although Spike did air Stooges shorts for a brief period of time after the block was canceled, as of late April 2008, the Stooges had disappeared from the network's schedule entirely. The Three Stooges returned on December 31, 2009, on AMC, starting with the "Countdown with the Stooges" New Year's Eve marathon. AMC planned to put several episodes on their website in 2010. The "Stooges" shorts were best known in Chicago as a part of a half-hour, late-afternoon show on WGN-TV hosted by Bob Bell as "Andy Starr" in the 1960s. In the 1990s Stooges films were aired as part of The Koz Zone movie segment on Chicago television.

Since the 1990s Columbia and its television division's successor, Sony Pictures Television, has preferred to license the Stooges shorts to cable networks, precluding the films from being shown on local broadcast TV. Two stations in Chicago and Boston, however, signed long-term syndication contracts with Columbia years ago and had declined to terminate them. WMEU-CD in Chicago aired all 190 Three Stooges shorts on Saturday afternoons and Sunday evenings until 2014. WSBK-TV in Boston aired Stooges shorts and feature films, including an annual New Year's Eve marathon until their contract expired in September 2022. KTLA in Los Angeles dropped the shorts in 1994, but brought them back in 2007 as part of a special retro-marathon commemorating the station's 60th anniversary. Since that time, the station's original 16mm Stooges film prints have aired occasionally as part of mini-marathons on holidays. Antenna TV, a network broadcasting on the digital subchannels of local broadcast stations (owned by Tribune Broadcasting, who also owns KTLA), began airing the Stooges shorts upon the network's January 1, 2011 launch, which ran in multi-hour blocks on weekends through December 29, 2012; most of the Three Stooges feature films are also broadcast on the network, through Antenna TV's distribution agreement with Sony Pictures Entertainment (whose Columbia Pictures subsidiary released most of the films). While the network stopped airing Stooges shorts regularly from 2013 to 2015, they were occasionally shown as filler if a movie ran short, as well as in holiday marathons. However, the shorts returned to Antenna TV's regular lineup on January 10, 2015. In 2019, The Three Stooges were picked up by MeTV as part of their lineup.

Columbia's library of 190 Stooge shorts has been modified for television distribution. Sony no longer offers the shorts on motion picture film, and now includes only 100 titles in the television package. All 190 shorts, however, have been released to home video.

Some films have been colorized by two separate companies. The first colorized DVD releases, distributed by Sony Pictures Home Entertainment, were prepared by West Wing Studios in 2004, using actual costumes and props for reference. The following year, Legend Films colorized the public domain shorts Malice in the Palace, Sing a Song of Six Pants, Disorder in the Court and Brideless Groom. Disorder in the Court and Brideless Groom also appears on two of West Wing's colorized releases. In any event, the Columbia-produced shorts (aside from the public domain films) are handled by Sony Pictures Entertainment, while the MGM Stooges shorts are owned by Warner Bros. via their Turner Entertainment division. Sony offers 21 of the shorts on their web platform Crackle, along with eleven Minisodes. Meanwhile, the rights to the Stooges' feature films rests with the studios that originally produced them (Columbia/Sony for the Columbia films, and The Walt Disney Company for the Fox Film/20th Century Fox films).

Home media
Between 1980 and 1985, Columbia Pictures Home Entertainment and RCA/Columbia Pictures Home Video released a total of thirteen Three Stooges volumes in various formats. The original thirteen volume titles were later reissued on VHS by its successor, Columbia TriStar Home Video, between 1993 and 1996, with a DVD reissue between 2000 and 2004.

The Three Stooges Collection 
On October 30, 2007, Sony Pictures Home Entertainment released a two-disc DVD set titled The Three Stooges Collection, Volume One: 1934–1936. The set contains shorts from the first three years the Stooges worked at Columbia Pictures, marking the first time ever that all 19 shorts were released in their original theatrical order to DVD. Additionally, every short was remastered in high definition, a first for the Stooge films. Previous DVD releases were based on themes (wartime, history, work, etc.), and sold poorly.

The chronological series proved successful, and Sony wasted little time preparing the next set for release. Volume Two: 1937–1939 was released on May 27, 2008, followed by Volume Three: 1940–1942 three months later on August 26, 2008. Demand exceeded supply, proving to Sony that they had a hit on their hands. In response, Volume Four: 1943–1945 was released on October 7, 2008, a mere two months after its predecessor. The global economic crisis slowed down the release schedule after Volume Four, and Volume Five: 1946–1948 was belatedly released on March 17, 2009. Volume Five is the first in the series to feature Shemp Howard with the Stooges and the final volume to feature Curly Howard. Volume Six: 1949–1951 was released June 16, 2009, and Volume Seven: 1952–1954 was released on November 10, 2009. Volume Seven included 3-D glasses for the two shorts: Spooks! and Pardon My Backfire. As of 2013, the 3-D versions of the two shorts in this volume have been removed. Volume Eight: 1955–1959 was released on June 1, 2010. This was the final volume of the Stooges collection, bringing the series to a close. Volume Eight comprised three discs, and was the only volume to feature Joe Besser and the final volume to feature Shemp Howard. With the release of the eighth volume, for the first time in history all 190 Three Stooges short subjects had become available to the public, uncut and unedited.

Two years later, on June 5, 2012, these discs were reissued in a DVD boxed set entitled The Three Stooges: The Ultimate Collection - now with a ninth volume (3 discs) entitled Rare Treasures from the Columbia Picture Vault. This volume is not available separately, and comprises two feature films and three cartoons featuring all three Stooges, and also some of their solo work (14 shorts featuring Shemp Howard, 10 shorts featuring Joe Besser, and four shorts featuring Joe DeRita). On October 18, 2016, The Three Stooges: The Complete DVD Collection was released. It had all the DVDs from volumes 1 through 8 but it did not include the "Rare Treasures from the Columbia Picture Vault" discs. All eight volumes are also available on iTunes. On June 15, 2020, iTunes released The Three Stooges: The Complete Series, which features all 190 shorts in an entire collection.

Music 

 Several instrumental tunes were played over the opening credits of the short features. The most commonly used were:
 The verse portion of the Civil War era song "Listen to the Mockingbird", played in a comical way, complete with sounds of birds and such. It was first used in Pardon My Scotch, their ninth short film, in 1935. (Prior to this, the opening theme varied and was typically connected to the storyline in some way.)
 "Three Blind Mice", beginning in 1939 as a slow but straightforward presentation (dubbed the "sliding strings" version), often breaking into a "jazzy" style before ending. In mid-1942, a faster version was used, featuring accordion.
 The Columbia short Woman Haters was done completely in rhyme, mostly recited (not sung), in rhythm with a Jazz-Age underscore running throughout the film, but with some key lines sung. It was sixth in a Musical Novelties short subject series, and appropriated its musical score from the first five films. The memorable "My Life, My Love, My All", was originally "At Last!" from the film Um-Pa.
 "Swinging the Alphabet" from Violent Is the Word for Curly is perhaps the best-known song performed by the Stooges on film.
 The Stooges broke into a three-part harmonized version of "Tears" ("You'll Never Know Just What Tears Are") in Horses' Collars, A Ducking They Did Go (where the melody was sung by Bud Jamison) and Half Shot Shooters. The song, written by Moe, Larry, Shemp, and one-time Ted Healy Stooge Fred Sanborn, first appeared in the 1930 feature film Soup to Nuts.
 The "Lucia Sextet" (Chi mi frena in tal momento?), from the opera Lucia di Lammermoor by Gaetano Donizetti (announced by Larry as "the Sextet from Lucy") is played on a record player and lip-synched by the Stooges in Micro-Phonies. The same melody reappears in Squareheads of the Round Table as the tune of "Oh, Elaine, can you come out tonight?". Micro-Phonies also includes the Johann Strauss II waltz "Voices of Spring" ("Frühlingsstimmen") Op. 410. Another Strauss waltz, "The Blue Danube", is featured in Ants in the Pantry and Punch Drunks.
 The original song "Frederick March" (named for the actor Fredric March but misspelled) was composed by staff musicians at the insistence of studio chief Harry Cohn. Weary of paying royalties for existing marches, Cohn wanted an original march that Columbia could own outright. "Frederick March" became a favorite of director Jules White; it appears in at least seven different Columbia shorts:
 Termites of 1938 – The Stooges "play" this song on a violin, flute, and string bass at a dinner party in an attempt to attract mice.
 Dutiful But Dumb – Curly is hidden inside a floor-standing radio, and plays the song on a modified harmonica.
 Three Little Twirps – Heard as background music at the circus while Moe and Curly sell tickets.
 Idle Roomers – Curly plays the song on a trombone to calm a wolf man—who goes berserk when he hears music.
 Gents Without Cents – Three girls perform acrobatics on stage while this song is playing.
 Gents in a Jam – Shemp and Moe have a problem with a radio that will not stop playing this song.
 Pardon My Backfire – The song plays on a car radio.
 The Moe/Larry/Curly Joe lineup of the Stooges recorded several musical record albums in the early 1960s. Most of their songs were adaptations of nursery rhymes. Among their more popular recordings were "Making a Record" (a surreal trip to a recording studio built around the song "Go Tell Aunt Mary"), "Three Little Fishes", "All I Want for Christmas Is My Two Front Teeth", "Wreck the Halls with Boughs of Holly", "Mairzy Doats" and "I Want a Hippopotamus for Christmas".
 In 1983, a group called the Jump 'N the Saddle Band recorded a track called "The Curly Shuffle", which featured the narrator singing about his love of the Stooges mixed with a chorus of many of Curly's catchphrases and sound effects. In the mid-1980s, the song became a popular mid-game hit for New York Mets fans in the Shea Stadium bleachers, who danced in small groups when the song was played between innings. The music video, which featured clips of the classic Stooges shorts, was also included as a bonus feature on one of the RCA/Columbia VHS releases.

Three feature-length Columbia releases were actually packages of older Columbia shorts. Columbia Laff Hour (introduced in 1956) was a random assortment that included the Stooges among other Columbia comedians like Andy Clyde, Hugh Herbert, and Vera Vague; the content and length varied from one theater to the next. Three Stooges Fun-o-Rama (introduced in 1959) was an all-Stooges show capitalizing on their TV fame, again with shorts chosen at random for individual theaters. The Three Stooges Follies (1974) was similar to Laff Hour, with a trio of Stooge comedies augmented by Buster Keaton and Vera Vague shorts, a Batman serial chapter, and a Kate Smith musical.

Museum 
It features three floors of exhibits and an 85-seat theater. Peter Seely, editor of the book Stoogeology: Essays on the Three Stooges, said that the Stoogeum has "more stuff than I even imagined existed." 2,500 people visit it yearly, many during the annual Three Stooges Fan Club gathering in April.

In other media

Comic books 

Over the years, several Three Stooges comics were produced.
 St. John Publications published the first Three Stooges comics in 1949 with 2 issues, then again in 1953–54 with 7 issues.
 Dell Comics published a Three Stooges series first as one-shots in their Four Color Comics line for five issues, then gave them a numbered series for four more issues (#6–9). With #10, the title would be published by Gold Key Comics. Under Gold Key, the series lasted through issue #55 in 1972.
 Gold Key Comics then published a series called The Little Stooges (7 issues, 1972–74) with story and art by Norman Maurer, Moe's son-in-law. This series featured the adventures of three fictional sons of the Three Stooges, as sort of modern-day teen-age versions of the characters.
 Eclipse Comics published the Three-D Three Stooges series (3 issues, 1986–1987) which reprinted stories from the St. John Publications series.
 Malibu Comics did a couple of one-shot comics, reprinting stories from the Gold Key Comics in 1989 and 1991.
 Eternity Comics published a one-shot comic book called The Three Stooges in 3-D in 1991, reprinting four stories from the Gold Key series.
 Bluewater Comics issued a biographical comic in 2011 which followed the lives and careers of the group.
 American Mythology Production publishes comics in 2017 which shows the Three Stooges in the modern times. In 2021, it was announced that American Mythology was launching two new books: The Three Stooges Thru The Ages and The Robonic Stooges. Both new series are written by S.A. Check and Jordan Gershowitz.

Phonograph records 
Beginning in 1959, the Three Stooges began appearing in a series of novelty records. Their first recording was a 45 rpm single of the title song from Have Rocket, Will Travel. The trio released additional singles and LPs on the Golden, Peter Pan and Coral labels, mixing comedy adventure albums and off-beat renditions of children's songs and stories. Their final recording was the 1966 Yogi Bear and the Three Stooges Meet the Mad, Mad, Mad Dr. No-No, which incorporated the Three Stooges into the cast of the Yogi Bear cartoons.

Radio 
Sirius XM Radio aired a special about the Stooges hosted by Tom Bergeron on Friday, July 31, 2009, at 2:00PM on the Sirius Howard 101 channel. Bergeron had conducted the interviews at the age of 16 back when he was still in high school in 1971. The television host had the tapes in storage for many years and was convinced on-air during an interview with Howard Stern to bring them in and turn it into a special.

After finding "the lost tapes", Bergeron brought them into Stern's production studio. He stated that the tapes were so old that the tapes with the Larry Fine interviews began to shred as Stern's radio engineers ran them on their tape players. They really had only one shot, but the tapes were saved.

"The Lost Stooges Tapes" was hosted by Tom Bergeron, with modern commentary on the almost 40-year-old interviews that he had conducted with Larry Fine and Moe Howard. At the times of these interviews, Moe was still living at home, while Larry had suffered a stroke and was living in a Senior Citizen's home.

Television

The New Three Stooges (1965–66) 

In addition to the unsuccessful television series pilots Jerks of All Trades, The Three Stooges Scrapbook, and the incomplete Kook's Tour, the Stooges appeared in an animated series, The New Three Stooges, which ran from 1965 to 1966. This series featured a mix of forty-one live-action segments which were used as wraparounds to 156 animated Stooges shorts. The New Three Stooges became the only regularly scheduled television show in history for the Stooges. Unlike other films shorts that aired on television, like the Looney Tunes, Tom and Jerry, and Popeye, the film shorts of the Stooges never had a regularly scheduled national television program to air in. When Columbia/Screen Gems licensed the film library to television, the shorts aired in any fashion the local stations chose (examples: late-night "filler" material between the end of the late movie and the channel's sign-off time; in "marathon" sessions running shorts back-to-back for one, one-and-a-half, or two hours; etc.) By the 1970s, some local stations showed a Columbia short and a New Three Stooges cartoon in the same broadcast.

The Robonic Stooges (1977–78) 

Another animated series also produced by Hanna-Barbera, titled The Robonic Stooges, originally seen as a featured segment on The Skatebirds (CBS, 1977–1978), featuring Moe, Larry, and Curly (voiced by Paul Winchell, Joe Baker and Frank Welker, respectively) as bionic cartoon superheroes with extendable limbs, similar to the later Inspector Gadget. The Robonic Stooges later aired as a separate half-hour series, retitled The Three Robonic Stooges (each half-hour featured two segments of The Three Robonic Stooges and one segment of Woofer & Whimper, Dog Detectives, the latter re-edited from episodes of Clue Club, an earlier Hanna-Barbera cartoon series).

The Three Stooges (TBA) 
On June 9, 2015, C3 Entertainment announced it is partnering with London-based production company Cake Entertainment and animation house Titmouse, Inc. to produce a new animated Three Stooges series, consisting of 52 11-minute episodes. Christy Karacas (Co-creator of Superjail!) directed the pilot episode, with Earl and Robert Benjamin, Chris Prynoski, Tom van Waveren and Edward Galton executive producing. The series will be launched to potential buyers at the market of the Annecy International Animated Film Festival.

Other appearances 
In the October 13, 1967 "Who's Afraid of Mother Goose?" episode of ABC's "World-of-Disney"-like anthology series Off to See the Wizard, the Three Stooges made a short appearance as "the three men in a tub".

Two episodes of Hanna-Barbera's The New Scooby-Doo Movies aired on CBS featuring animated Stooges as guest stars: the premiere, "Ghastly Ghost Town" (September 9, 1972) and "The Ghost of the Red Baron" (November 18, 1972).

In a 1980 episode of M*A*S*H, Charles Winchester shows disrespect for three Korean doctors by calling them "Moe, Larry and Curly", and says that they are "highly-respected individuals in the States". After Winchester throws out his back and is unable to relieve the pain through conventional methods (in real life, Winchester would've received an automatic medical discharge from the United States Army), Colonel Potter has the Korean doctors try acupuncture (much to Winchester's dismay), which cures Winchester. After the treatment, one of the doctors tells Winchester "Not bad for Three Stooges, huh?", having caught on to his mistreatment of them.

In the episode "Beware the Creeper" of The New Batman Adventures, the Joker retreats to his hide-out after a quick fight with Batman. He yells out for his three henchmen "Moe? Larr? Cur?" only to find that they are not there. Shortly after that, Batman comes across these three goons in a pool hall; they have distinctive accents and hairstyles similar to those of Moe, Larry and Curly. These henchmen are briefly seen throughout the rest of the season.

Television film (2000) 

In 2000, long-time Stooge fan Mel Gibson executive-produced a TV film (The Three Stooges) about the lives and careers of the comedians. Playing Moe was Paul Ben-Victor, Evan Handler was Larry, John Kassir was Shemp, and Michael Chiklis was Curly. It was filmed in Australia and was produced for and broadcast on ABC. It was based on Michael Fleming's authorized biography of the Stooges, The Three Stooges: From Amalgamated Morons to American Icons. Its unflattering portrayal of Ted Healy led Healy's son to give media interviews calling the film inaccurate. Additional errors of fact included the portrayal that Moe Howard was down on his luck after Columbia cancelled their contract and worked as a gofer at the studio, where he, his brothers and Larry had formerly worked as actors. In reality, Moe was the most careful with his money, which he invested well. He and his wife Helen owned a comfortable house in Toluca Lake, in which they raised their children.

Film

It's a Mad, Mad, Mad, Mad World (1963) 

The Three Stooges (in their Curly Joe period) make a brief cameo appearance as airport firemen in the 1963 film It's a Mad, Mad, Mad, Mad World. An epic comedy with an all-star cast, this film contains many cameo appearances by famous comedians.

The Three Stooges (2012) 

A film featuring the Three Stooges, titled The Three Stooges, started production on March 14, 2011, with 20th Century Fox and was directed by the Farrelly brothers. The film had been in what one critic has dubbed "development hell". The Farrellys, who wanted to make the film since 1996, said that they were not going to do a biopic or remake, but instead new Three Stooges episodes set in the present day. The film is broken up into three continuous episodes that revolves around the Stooges characters.

Casting the title characters proved difficult for the studio. Originally slated were Sean Penn to play Larry, Benicio del Toro to play Moe, and Jim Carrey to play Curly. Both Penn and del Toro left the project but returned while no official confirmation had been made about Jim Carrey. When del Toro was interviewed on MTV News for The Wolfman, he spoke about playing Moe. He was later asked who was going to play Larry and Curly in the film and commented that he still thought that Sean Penn and Jim Carrey were going to play them, though he added, "Nothing is for sure yet."
A story in The Hollywood Reporter stated that Will Sasso would play Curly in the upcoming comedy and that Hank Azaria was the front runner to play Moe. Sasso was ultimately cast as Curly; Sean Hayes of Will & Grace was cast as Larry Fine, while Chris Diamantopoulos was cast as Moe. Jane Lynch later joined the cast, playing a nun. The film was released on April 13, 2012, and grossed over $54 million worldwide. The film received mixed reviews, but Diamantopoulos, Hayes, and Sasso were praised for their performances as Moe, Larry, and Curly.

Sequel 
On May 7, 2015, a sequel was announced, with Sean Hayes, Chris Diamantopoulos, and Will Sasso all reprising their roles. Cameron Fay has been hired to write the script. Production was scheduled to begin in 2018.

The Three Little Stooges (TBA) 
On February 3, 2016, C3 announced a new action/adventure film titled The Three Little Stooges. It will star Gordy De StJeor, Liam Dow, and Luke Clark as 12-year-old versions of Moe, Larry, and Curly. The first film, which will set the foundation for future films and television spin-offs, is set to begin production in November 2017, and expected to be released in 2018. The screenplay was written by Harris Goldberg, with Sean McNamara set to direct. The film's budget is $5.8 million. On July 19, 2017, C3 began seeking crowdfunding to pay for a portion of the budget. In August 2017, they exceeded their minimum goal of $50,000.

Video games 

In 1984, Gottlieb released an arcade game featuring the Stooges trying to find three kidnapped brides.

Later in 1987, game developers Cinemaware released a successful Three Stooges computer game, available for Apple IIGS, Amiga, Commodore 64, MS-DOS, and Nintendo Entertainment System (NES). Based on the Stooges earning money by doing odd jobs to prevent the foreclosure of an orphanage, it incorporated audio from the original films and was popular enough to be reissued for the Game Boy Advance in 2002, as well as for PlayStation in 2004.

The Three Stooges also have a slot game adaptation created by Realtime Gaming.

VCR game 
A VCR game was released by Pressman Toy Corporation in 1986, which utilized a number of classic Stooges clips.

In foreign languages 
In most other languages, the Three Stooges are known by some corresponding variant of their English name. In Chinese, however, the trio is known idiomatically as Sānge Chòu Píjiàng (三個臭皮匠) or Huóbǎo Sānrénzǔ (活寶三人組). Sānge Chòu Píjiàng, literally "Three Smelly Shoemakers", which derives from a saying in the Romance of the Three Kingdoms: Sāngè chòu píjiàng shèngguò yīgè Zhūgě Liàng (三個臭皮匠，勝過一個諸葛亮) or "Three smelly shoemakers (are enough to) overcome one Zhuge Liang [a hero of the story]", i.e. three inferior people can overpower a superior person when they combine their strength. Huóbǎo Sānrénzǔ translates as "Trio of Buffoons". Likewise in Japanese they are known as San Baka Taishō (三ばか大将) meaning "Three Idiot Generals" or "Three Baka Generals".

In Spanish they are known as Los tres chiflados or, roughly, "The Three Crackpots". In French and German usage, the name of the trio is partially translated as Les Trois Stooges (though the French version of the movie adaptation used a fully translated name, "Les Trois Corniauds") and Die drei Stooges respectively. In Italy they are known as I tre marmittoni. In Thai, the trio is known as 3 สมุนจอมป่วน or 3 พี่น้องจอมยุ่ง. In Portuguese, they are known as Os Três Patetas in Brazil, and Os Três Estarolas in Portugal, estarola being a direct translation of "stooge", while pateta being more related to "goofy". In Persian the trio are dubbed as "سه نخاله". In Turkish, they are dubbed as Üç Ahbap Çavuş ("The Three Cronies").

Awards and nominations 
In 1993, the Three Stooges won the MTV Lifetime Achievement Award.

They received a star on the Hollywood Walk of Fame at 1560 Vine Street on August 30, 1983.

See also 
 List of slapstick comedy topics
 The Three Stooges filmography

References 
Notes

Further reading
 Besser, Joe (with Lenburg, Jeff, and Lenburg, Greg), Not Just a Stooge (1984) Excelsior Books, Inc. (reissued 1987 as Once a Stooge, Always a Stooge) Roundtable Publications (Autobiography of Joe Besser, including anecdotes about Abbott and Costello and Olsen and Johnson)
 Bruskin, David N., Behind the Three Stooges: The White Brothers: Conversations with David N. Bruskin (1993) Directors Guild of America (In-depth interviews with producer-directors Jules White, Jack White, and Sam White)
 Comedy III Productions, Inc., Pop, You're "Poifect!": A Three Stooges Salute to Dad (2002) Andrews McMeel
 Davis, Lon and Davis, Debra (eds.), Stooges Among Us (2008) BearManor Media 
 Feinberg, Morris, Larry: The Stooge in the Middle (1984) Last Gasp of San Francisco (Biography of Larry Fine, attributed to his brother but actually ghostwritten by Bob Davis)
 Fericano, Paul, Stoogism Anthology (1977) Poor Souls Printing
 Fine, Larry (with Carone, James), Stroke of Luck (1973) Siena Publishing Co. (Larry Fine's autobiography, transcribed from interviews toward the end of his life)
 Flanagan, Bill, Last of the Moe Haircuts (1986) McGraw-Hill/Contemporary Books, Inc.
 Fleming, Michael, The Three Stooges: An Illustrated History, from Amalgamated Morons to American Icons (2002) Broadway Publishing
 Forrester, Jeffrey, The Stoogephile Trivia Book (1982) Contemporary Books, Inc.
 Forrester, Jeffrey, The Stooge Chronicles (1981) Contemporary Books, Inc. (Comprehensive overview of the team's career; also discusses the various Ted Healy stooges)
 Forrester, Tom, with Forrester, Jeff, The Stooges' Lost Episodes (1988) Contemporary Books, Inc. (Discussion of obscure Stooges appearances, including solo films by individual Stooges)
 Forrester, Jeff, with Forrester, Tom, and Wallison, Joe, The Three Stooges: The Triumphs and Tragedies of the Most Popular Comedy Team of All Time (2001) Donaldson Books
 Garner, Paul, Mousie Garner: Autobiography of a Vaudeville Stooge (1999) McFarland & Co.
 Hansen, Tom and Forrester, Jeffrey, Stoogemania: An Extravaganza of Stooge Photos, Puzzles, Trivia, Collectibles and More (1984) Contemporary Books, Inc. (Overview of Three Stooges memorabilia)
 Howard, Moe, Moe Howard and the Three Stooges (1977) Citadel Press (Moe Howard's autobiography, completed and released posthumously by his daughter)
 Koceimba, Bill, with Kaufman, Eric A., and Sack, Steve, The Three Stooges Golf Spoof and Trivia Book (1999) Gazelle, Inc.
 Kurson, Robert, The Official Three Stooges Encyclopedia: The Ultimate Knucklehead's Guide to Stoogedom, from Amalgamated Association of Morons to Ziller, Zeller, and Zoller (1999) McGraw-Hill
 Kurson, Robert, The Official Three Stooges Cookbook (1998) Contemporary Books, Inc.
 Lenburg, Jeff, with Maurer, Joan Howard, and Lenburg, Greg, The Three Stooges Scrapbook (1982, revised 1994, 2000) Citadel Press
 Longley, Maximillian, The Conservative In Spite of Himself: A Reluctant Right-Winger's Thoughts on Life, Law and the Three Stooges (2007) Monograph Publishers
 Maltin, Leonard, The Great Movie Comedians (1978) Crown Books
 Maltin, Leonard, Movie Comedy Teams (1970, revised 1985) New American Library
 Maltin, Leonard, Selected Short Subjects (first published as The Great Movie Shorts, 1972) Crown Books, (revised 1983) Da Capo Press
 McGarry, Annie, The Wacky World of the Three Stooges (1992) Crescent Books
 Maurer, Joan Howard, Curly: An Illustrated Biography of the Superstooge (1985, revised 1988) Citadel Press
 Maurer, Joan Howard (ed.), The Three Stooges Book of Scripts (1984) Citadel Press
 Maurer, Joan Howard and Maurer, Norman (eds.), The Three Stooges Book of Scripts, Volume II (1987) Citadel Press
 Okuda, Ted and Watz, Edward, The Columbia Comedy Shorts (1998) McFarland & Co. (Comprehensive history of the Columbia short subject department; Stooge colleagues Edward Bernds and Emil Sitka are quoted extensively)
 Pauley, Jim, "The Three Stooges Hollywood Filming Locations" (2012) Santa Monica Press (documents the outdoor filming locations of the Stooges' most famous Columbia Pictures short films made in and around Hollywood between 1934 and 1958
 Smith, Ronald L., The Stooge Fans' I.Q. Test (1988) Contemporary Books, Inc.
 Solomon, Jon, The Complete Three Stooges: The Official Filmography and Three Stooges Companion (2000) Comedy III Productions

External links 

 Three Stooges Online Filmography
 
 The Stoogeum (Three Stooges Museum)
 
 Portrait (2009) of The Three Stooges (with Shemp) by noted illustrator Drew Friedman
 Interview with Moe Howard on new success with the younger generation from the Ocala Star-Banner – February 22, 1959 accessed via Google News
 
 
 

 
Mass media franchises introduced in 1925
American people of Lithuanian-Jewish descent
American comedy troupes
Jewish American comedians
Dell Comics titles
Films adapted into comics
Films adapted into television shows
Gold Key Comics titles
Jewish comedy and humor
Jewish American male comedians
Jewish male comedians
Metro-Goldwyn-Mayer contract players
Columbia Pictures contract players
Slapstick comedians
Vaudeville performers